A knuckleboom crane is a kind of standard crane whose boom articulates at the 'knuckle' near the middle, letting it fold back like a finger. This provides a compact size for storage and manoeuvring.

Knuckleboom cranes have become very common on offshore vessels as less of the deck space is blocked by the crane. Disadvantages of this crane type are the higher power demand and increased maintenance requirement due to the increased number of moving parts.

Knuckleboom crane arms are much lighter than boom truck cranes, and they are designed to allow for more payloads to be carried on the back of the truck that it is mounted on. The majority of them are mounted behind the cab and leave the entire bed of the truck empty.

The cranes come with different types of control systems, such as: stand up, control from the ground, seat control, or radio remote control. The radio remote systems now can start the crane as well as run the crane. Currently, they come equipped with a computer readout system that immediately gives readouts from the system if the crane is overloaded or not.

Notable manufacturers
 Hiab
Palfinger

See also
 Crane (machine)#Loader crane Atlas Cranes GMBH

References

External links 
Link to image

Cranes by type